The 15th Independent Spirit Awards, honoring the best in independent filmmaking for 1999, were announced on March 25, 2000.  It was hosted by Jennifer Tilly.

Nominees and winners

{| class="wikitable"
!Best Feature
!Best Director
|-
|Election

 Cookie's Fortune
 The Limey
 The Straight Story
 Sugar Town
|Alexander Payne – Election

 Harmony Korine – Julien Donkey-Boy
 Doug Liman – Go
 David Lynch – The Straight Story
 Steven Soderbergh – The Limey
|-
!Best Male Lead
!Best Female Lead
|-
|Richard Farnsworth – The Straight Story

 John Cusack – Being John Malkovich
 Terence Stamp – The Limey
 David Strathairn – Limbo
 Noble Willingham – The Corndog Man
|Hilary Swank – Boys Don't Cry

 Diane Lane – A Walk on the Moon
 Janet McTeer – Tumbleweeds
Susan Traylor – Valerie Flake
 Reese Witherspoon – Election
|-
!Best Supporting Male
!Best Supporting Female
|-
|Steve Zahn – Happy, Texas

 Charles S. Dutton – Cookie's Fortune
 Clark Gregg – The Adventures of Sebastian Cole
 Luis Guzmán – The Limey
 Terrence Howard – The Best Man
|Chloë Sevigny – Boys Don't Cry

 Barbara Barrie – Judy Berlin
 Vanessa Martinez – Limbo
 Sarah Polley – Go
 Jean Smart – Guinevere
|-
!Best Screenplay
!Best First Screenplay
|-
|Election – Alexander Payne and Jim Taylor Dogma – Kevin Smith
 Guinevere – Audrey Wells
 The Limey – Lem Dobbs
 SLC Punk! – James Merendino
|Being John Malkovich – Charlie Kaufman The Adventures of Sebastian Cole – Kip Williams
 Boys Don't Cry – Kimberly Peirce and Andy Bienen
 Cookie's Fortune – Anne Rapp
 The Straight Story – John Roach and Mary Sweeney
|-
!Best Cinematography
!Best Debut Performance
|-
|Three Seasons – Lisa Rinzler The City – Harlan Bosmajian
 Judy Berlin – Jeffrey Seckendorf
 Julien Donkey-Boy – Anthony Dod Mantle
 Twin Falls Idaho – M. David Mullen
|Kimberly J. Brown – Tumbleweeds

 Jessica Campbell – Election
 Jade Gordon – Sugar Town
 Toby Smith – Drylongso
 Chris Stafford – Edge of Seventeen
|-
!Best First Feature (Over $500,000)
!Best First Feature (Under $500,000)
|-
|Being John Malkovich

 Boys Don't Cry
 Three Seasons
 Twin Falls Idaho
 Xiu Xiu: The Sent Down Girl
|The Blair Witch Project

 The City
 Compensation
 Judy Berlin
 Treasure Island
|-
! colspan="2" |  Best Foreign Film
|-
|  colspan="2"  | Run Lola Run • Germany All About My Mother • Spain
 My Son the Fanatic • UK
 Rosetta • Belgium/France
 Topsy-Turvy • UK
|}

Special awards

Truer Than Fiction AwardNight Waltz: The Music of Paul Bowles
 American Hollow
 On the Ropes
 Well-Founded Fear

Producers Award
Pamela Koffler – I'm Losing You
 Eva Kolodner – Boys Don't Cry
 Paul Mezey – The City
 Christine K. Walker – Backroads and Homo Heights

Someone to Watch Award
Cauleen Smith – Drylongso
 Dan Clark – The Item
 Julian Goldberger – Trans
 Lisanne Skyler – Getting to Know You

Films with multiple nominations and awards

Films that received multiple nominations

Films that won multiple awards

References

External links 
 1999 Spirit Awards at IMDb
 Full show on Film Independent's official YouTube channel

1999
Independent Spirit Awards